Mamadou Mariem Diallo (born 2 March 1967) is a Senegalese footballer. He played in ten matches for the Senegal national football team from 1993 to 1994. He was also named in Senegal's squad for the 1992 African Cup of Nations tournament.

References

External links
 

1967 births
Living people
Senegalese footballers
Senegal international footballers
1992 African Cup of Nations players
1994 African Cup of Nations players
Place of birth missing (living people)
Association football defenders